The 2021 Trofeo Laigueglia was a one-day road cycling race that took place on 2 March 2021 in and around Laigueglia, Liguria, on the northwestern coast of Italy. It was the 58th edition of the Trofeo Laigueglia and was rated as a 1.Pro event as part of the 2021 UCI Europe Tour and the 2021 UCI ProSeries.

Teams 
Ten UCI WorldTeams, nine UCI ProTeans, and six UCI Continental teams made up the twenty-five teams that participated in the race. However, the remainder of the  team withdrew after an unnamed rider tested positive for COVID-19 ahead of the race. With Gianni Moscon of  also being a non-starter after sustaining injuries from a crash in Kuurne–Brussels–Kuurne three days prior, there were 166 riders who started the race, of which only 82 finished.

UCI WorldTeams

 
 
 
 
 
 
 
 
 
 

UCI ProTeams

 
 
 
 
 
 
 
 
 

UCI Continental Teams

Result

References 

Trofeo Laigueglia
Trofeo Laigueglia
Trofeo Laigueglia
2021
Trofeo Laigueglia